Headpile Eyot is long and narrow eyot in the River Thames, situated just above Bray Lock. It is also near the village of Bray, Berkshire.
The island is small and covered with trees such as Horse chestnut and English oaks. Bronze Age finds have been found on the Eyot.

References

See also
Islands in the River Thames

Islands of Berkshire
Islands of the River Thames
Bray, Berkshire